Nimdur (also Romanized as Nīmdūr and Nīm Dowr) is a village in Boyer Ahmad-e Garmsiri Rural District, in the Central District of Gachsaran County, Kohgiluyeh and Boyer-Ahmad Province, Iran. At the 2006 census, its population was 52, in 14 families.

References 

Populated places in Gachsaran County